Judith (Judy) Green (born 1943) is an American logician and historian of mathematics who studies women in mathematics. She is a founding member of the Association for Women in Mathematics; she has also served as its vice president, and as the vice president of the American Association of University Professors.

Education and career
Green earned her bachelor's degree at Cornell University.
She completed a master's degree at Yale University,
and a Ph.D. at the University of Maryland, College Park.
Her dissertation, supervised by Carol Karp and finished in 1972, was
Consistency Properties for Uncountable Finite-Quantifier Languages.

She belonged to the faculty of Rutgers University before moving to Marymount University in 1989. After retiring from Marymount in 2007, she became a volunteer at the National Museum of American History.

Book
With Jeanne LaDuke, she wrote Pioneering Women in American Mathematics: The Pre-1940 PhD’s (American Mathematical Society and London Mathematical Society, 2009). This was a biographical study of the first women in the U.S. to earn doctorates in mathematics.

Recognition
She is part of the 2019 class of fellows of the Association for Women in Mathematics.

References

1943 births
Place of birth missing (living people)
Living people
20th-century American mathematicians
American women mathematicians
Mathematical logicians
Women logicians
American historians of mathematics
Cornell University alumni
Yale University alumni
University of Maryland, College Park alumni
Rutgers University faculty
Marymount University faculty
Fellows of the Association for Women in Mathematics
20th-century women mathematicians
20th-century American women
21st-century American women